Matthew Alexander Ruebel (born October 16, 1969) is a former American Major League Baseball (MLB) pitcher who played for the Pittsburgh Pirates and Tampa Bay Devil Rays from 1996 to 1998.

Amateur career
A native of Cincinnati, Ohio, Ruebel attended Ames High School and the University of Oklahoma. In 1988, he played collegiate summer baseball with the Wareham Gatemen of the Cape Cod Baseball League, and returned to the league in 1989 to play for the Harwich Mariners.

Professional career
Ruebel was drafted by the Pittsburgh Pirates in the 3rd round of the 1991 Major League Baseball Draft and pitched parts of three major league seasons for the Pirates and Tampa Bay Devil Rays. Ruebel won 4 games in the majors and had one career save, coming on September 15, 1996. In the first game of a doubleheader, Ruebel threw 2 shutout innings to preserve a 4–1 Pirates victory over the Giants.

References

External links
, or Retrosheet, or The Baseball Gauge, or Venezuela Winter League

1969 births
Living people
American expatriate baseball players in Canada
Augusta Pirates players
Baseball players from Cincinnati
Binghamton Mets players
Calgary Cannons players
Carolina Mudcats players
Durham Bulls players
Harwich Mariners players
Jupiter Hammerheads players
Leones del Caracas players
American expatriate baseball players in Venezuela
Major League Baseball pitchers
Norfolk Tides players
Oklahoma Sooners baseball players
Ottawa Lynx players
Pittsburgh Pirates players
Salem Buccaneers players
Tampa Bay Devil Rays players
Tucson Sidewinders players
University of Oklahoma alumni
Wareham Gatemen players
Welland Pirates players
Zion Pioneerzz players
Anchorage Bucs players